The 2020 Polish Indoor Athletics Championships was the 64th edition of the national championship in indoor track and field for Poland, organised by the Polish Athletic Association. It was held on 29 February – 1 March at Arena Toruń in Toruń. A total of 31 events (divided evenly between the sexes, with one mixed-sex event) were contested over the two-day competition. It was to serve as preparation for the 2020 World Athletics Indoor Championships, which was postponed due to the COVID-19 outbreak in China before the German championships.

Results

Men

Women

Mixed

References

Results
 64. PZLA HMP: płotki, sprinty i skok wzwyż ozdobami pierwszego dnia rywalizacji w Toruniu . Polish Athletics Federation (2020-02-29). Retrieved 2020-03-02.

Polish Indoor Athletics Championships
Polish Indoor Athletics Championships
Polish Indoor Athletics Championships
Polish Indoor Athletics Championships
Sport in Toruń